Semiscolecidae is a family of annelids belonging to the order Arhynchobdellida.

Genera:
 Cyclobdella Weyenbergh, 1879
 Orchibdella Ringuelet, 1945
 Patagoniobdella Ringuelet, 1972

References

Annelids